Jan Silný (born 15 February 1995 in Uherské Hradiště) is a Czech professional footballer who plays as a forward for SK Líšeň.

References

External links
 
 Profile at MSFL.cz

1995 births
Living people
People from Uherské Hradiště
Czech footballers
Association football forwards
Czech National Football League players
SK Líšeň players
SK Hanácká Slavia Kroměříž players
FK Baník Sokolov players
Sportspeople from the Zlín Region